Subliminal Plastic Motives is the debut studio album from rock band Self, and is perhaps their most well-known release.

The album was recorded entirely by Matt and his brother, Mike. The album found some modest success with MTV and flagship radio stations like KROQ-FM. Once the band was solidified, videos were made for "So Low" and "Cannon".

The album was released by Spongebath Records and was immediately picked up by Zoo Entertainment (now Volcano Entertainment). Critical reception was very positive, with Mahaffey receiving praise for his cut-and-paste, eclectic take on rock music, and garnering comparisons to artists such as Beck and Beastie Boys. Many of Self's fans hold the album in high regard and most of the songs are now fan favorites. While the album featured a hearty dose of what could best be described as "modern rock" songs, elements such as hip-hop beats, jazzy piano, dense, complex arrangements, and triggers/samples were dispersed throughout, hinting at Mahaffey's versatility as a composer and Self's future musical directions.

Track listing

Personnel
Vocals - Matt Mahaffey
Bass (Additional) - Don Kerce (tracks: 4,5,9,11,12)
Performer - Matt Mahaffey, Mike Mahaffey
Photography (Cover) - Brian Bottcher
Photography (Inlay) - Jim Harrington
Electric Piano (Outro) - Chris James (tracks: 4)
Saxophone (Alto) - Sam Baker (tracks: 5)
Trumpet - Brian Rogers (tracks: 5)
Other (Handclaps) - Seth Timbs (tracks: 6)

Production
Producer - Self
Mastering - Bob Ludwig
Mixing - Jim Faraci, Self
Engineer - Jim Faraci
Engineer (Assistant) - Pete Martinez, Sean McLean
Sampler - Matt Mahaffey
Sampler (Texturing) - Brian Rogers (tracks: 2)

References

1995 debut albums
Self (band) albums
Zoo Entertainment (record label) albums